Georg Belwe (12 August 1878 – 1954) was a German type designer, typographer, graphic artist and teacher.

Personal information
Belwe was born on 8 December 1878 in Berlin, Germany. He studied and later taught at the teaching institute of  Königliches Kunstgewerbemuseum in his native Berlin.

Career

1900
In 1900, with Fritz Helmut Ehmcke and Friedrich Wilhelm Kleukens, he founded Steglitzer Werkstadt, a private press. This same year he joins the Kunstgewerbeschule as a teacher in Berlin.

1906
In 1906 he became head of typography department and the class for accurate drawing at the Leipzig Akademie für Graphische Künste und Buchgewerbe.

Productions
Belwe has produced numerous works for publishing houses which include:
List
Reclam
Eugen Diederichs 
Westermann

Publications
His publications include: 
Albert Mundt "Georg Belwe und seine Klasse an der Königlichen Akademie für graphische Künste und Buchgewerbe" in "Archiv für Buchgewerbe" In June 1910.

Death
Belwe died in Ronneburg, Germany in 1954.

Fonts Designed by Georg Belwe
 Belwe Roman (Schelter & Giesecke Type Foundry, 1907)
 Belwe Gotisch (1912)
 Belwe Schrägschrift (1913)
 Belwe halbfett (1914)
 Wieland (Schelter & Giesecke Type Foundry, 1926)
 Fleischman (L. Wagner Type Foundry, 1927), based on the eighteenth century designs of Joan Michaël Fleischman
 Schönschrift Mozart (1927)
 Shakespere Medaeval (Schelter & Giesecke Type Foundry, 1927–1929)

Sources
  Jaspert, W. Pincus, W. Turner Berry and A.F. Johnson. The Encyclopedia of Type Faces. Blandford Press Lts.: 1953, 1983. .
  Friedl, Ott, and Stein, Typography: an Encyclopedic Survey of Type Design and Techniques Throughout History. Black Dog & Levinthal Publishers: 1998. .
  Macmillsn, Niel, An A-Z of Type Designers, Yale University Press, 2006.

References

1878 births
1954 deaths
German graphic designers
German typographers and type designers
People from Berlin